The Internationales Stadionfest (ISTAF) is an annual track and field athletics meeting at the Olympic Stadium in Berlin, Germany. It was first held in July 1921 at the Deutsches Stadion, which was replaced from 1937 by the Stadium of the 1936 Olympic Games. Since 2006 ISTAF has been sponsored by DKB and officially known as the DKB-ISTAF and from 2010, had been part of the IAAF World Challenge, the second tier of global one day athletics events. Nowadays it's part of the World Athletics Continental Tour Silver tier, the third overall tier.

History
On 3 July 1921 the Berliner Sport-Club (BSC), the Sport-Club Charlottenburg (SCC) and the Schwimm-Club Poseidon organised the first sports festival under the current name of Internationales Stadionfest or ISTAF. On 23 March 1937 the BSC, the Deutscher Sport-Club (DSC, later Olympischer Sport-Club OSC) and the SCC, agreed to hold international sports festivals together and organized the first meeting on 1 August 1937 at the Olympic Stadium, where the event is still held today.  Four ISTAF meetings, in 1938, 1941, the first post-war in 1949, as well as 1953, were all held at the Mommsen Stadium, but since 1955 meetings have been held annually at Berlin's Olympic Stadium in Charlottenburg.  The 2002 and 2003 ISTAF meetings were held at the Friedrich-Ludwig-Jahn-Sportpark instead, due to reconstruction of the Olympic Stadium in preparation for the 2006 FIFA World Cup.

There were several ISTAF-free years during the Second World War and after: 1940, as well as 1943-48 and again in 1950 and 1951. A meeting wasn't held in 1972 because of the 1972 Summer Olympics and again in 1973, as a result of the terrorist attack at the 1972 Olympic Games. 
From 1993 to 1997, the IAAF classified ISTAF among the Golden Four meetings and from 1998 to 2009, it became part of the IAAF Golden League. When the Diamond League was conceived, it had been provisionally planned for Berlin to hold one of its meetings, but it was unable to meet the criteria set for the new elite series, therefore as from 2010, ISTAF became part of the second tier World Challenge circuit instead.

Indoor Events
ISTAF was also held as an indoor meeting at the Deutschlandhalle for a few years until 1968, and from 2014 onwards as the ISTAF Indoor at the Mercedes Benz Arena (formerly O2 World Berlin), the first large indoor athletics event in Berlin for some time.

On 31 January 2021, the ISTAF Indoor Düsseldorf will be held in Düsseldorf as the successor to the PSD Bank Meeting, against a larger backdrop at the ISS Dome. Meeting director and managing director of the ISTAF is Martin Seeber.

World Records
Over the course of its history, many world records have been set at the ISTAF.

Meeting records

Men

Women

List of winners

Track disciplines

References

External links

 Official website
 TOP 10 ISTAF-Starters

Annual track and field meetings
IAAF Golden League
IAAF World Challenge
Sports competitions in Berlin
International sports competitions hosted by Germany
Athletics competitions in Germany
Recurring sporting events established in 1937
Athletics in Berlin
IAAF World Outdoor Meetings